The 2010 Delray Beach International Tennis Championships was a tennis tournament played on outdoor hard courts. It was the 18th edition of the Delray Beach International Tennis Championships, and was part of the International Series of the 2010 ATP World Tour. It took place at the Delray Beach Tennis Center in Delray Beach, Florida, United States, from February 22 through February 28, 2010. Unseeded Ernests Gulbis won the singles title.

ATP entrants

Seeds

Rankings as of February 15, 2010.

Other entrants
The following players received wildcards into the main draw:
 Tommy Haas
 Sébastien Grosjean
 Vincent Spadea

The following players received entry from the qualifying draw:
 Kevin Anderson
 Ryan Harrison
 Robert Kendrick
 Nick Lindahl

Finals

Singles

 Ernests Gulbis defeated  Ivo Karlović, 6–2, 6–3.
It was Gulbis' first singles title of his career.

Doubles

 Bob Bryan /  Mike Bryan defeated  Philipp Marx /  Igor Zelenay, 6–3, 7–6(7–3).

References

External links
Official website

Delray Beach
Delray Beach Open
Delray Beach International
Delray Beach International Tennis Championships
Delray Beach International Tennis Championships